Petrotilapia tridentiger is a species of cichlid endemic to Lake Malawi where it prefers shallow waters with rocky substrates.  This species can reach a length  TL.  This species can also be found in the aquarium trade.

References

tridentiger
Fish of Lake Malawi
Fish of Malawi
Fish described in 1935
Taxa named by Ethelwynn Trewavas
Taxonomy articles created by Polbot